MDCA may refer to:
 Acetyl-S-ACP:malonate ACP transferase, an enzyme
 Manchester and District Cricket Association